Marisa Henrike Ewers is a German former footballer who played as a defender for Aston Villa, Birmingham City, Bayer Leverkusen and Hamburger SV. She is currently General Manager of Aston Villa Women.

Ewers started playing football at the age of eight. In 2006, she joined Bundesliga club Hamburger SV where she first played for the reserve team in the second German division Since 2007, Ewers had been part of the Bundesliga team. However in 2012, shortly after Hamburg announced its disestablishment of the women's section, she joined Bayer 04 Leverkusen where she immediately became a regular starter. In 2008, Ewers was part of the German squad which took part at the Under-19 Championship.

Ewers moved to English football, joining Birmingham City in 2016, before leaving to join their rivals Aston Villa in the division below, helping them to secure promotion to the Women's Super League. 

In February 2022, Ewers announced her retirement from playing. Having already undertook a recruitment role at Aston Villa alongside her playing days, Ewers was made Head of Recruitment at the conclusion of the 2022/23 season, and subsequently promoted to General Manager in 2023.

Career statistics

References

1989 births
Living people
Bayer 04 Leverkusen (women) players
Hamburger SV (women) players
German women's footballers
German expatriate women's footballers
Women's Super League players
Birmingham City W.F.C. players
Expatriate women's footballers in England
German expatriate sportspeople in England
Women's association football defenders
Footballers from Hamburg
Aston Villa W.F.C. players

Women's Championship (England) players
Frauen-Bundesliga players